Charles E. Toole (January 5, 1922 – June 23, 2008) was an American football coach. He served as the head coach at Loras College in Dubuque, Iowa from 1955 to 1957.

References

External links

1922 births
2008 deaths
Boston College Eagles football players
Loras Duhawks football coaches
Players of American football from Boston